Leo William "Red" Nonnenkamp (July 7, 1911  – December 3, 2000) was an outfielder in Major League Baseball who played between  and  for the Pittsburgh Pirates (1933) and Boston Red Sox (1938–1940). He was born in St. Louis, Missouri.

In a four-season career, Nonnenkamp was a .262 hitter (69-for-263) with 49 runs and 24 RBI in 155 games, including six doubles, two triples, six stolen bases, and a .347 on-base percentage. 
 
Nonnenkamp died at the age of 89 in Little Rock, Arkansas.

External links

Boston Red Sox players
Pittsburgh Pirates players
Major League Baseball outfielders
Baseball players from Missouri
1911 births
2000 deaths
Altoona Engineers players
Beaver Falls Beavers players
El Dorado Lions players
Little Rock Travelers players
Scottdale Cardinals players
Newark Bears (IL) players
Tulsa Oilers (baseball) players
Jeannette Jays players
Waynesboro Red Birds players
Kansas City Blues (baseball) players